Jarl Robert Hemmer (18 September 1893 – 6 December 1944) was a Swedish-speaking Finnish author. He was nominated for the Nobel Prize in Literature in six consecutive years.

Biography
Hemmer was born into a wealthy family, from Vaasa, Finland. His first collection of poems was called Rösterna (The Voices) and it was published in 1914. He made his breakthrough in 1922 with another collection of epic poetry called Rågens rike (Realm of the Rye). He got The Great Nordic Novel Prize (Stora Nordiska Romanpriset) for En man och hans samvete (A Fool of Faith), a book about the Finnish Civil War, published in 1931. Hemmer was among the contributors of Garm which was a Swedish language satirical and political magazine based in Helsinki.

Following the murder of Kaj Munk on 4 January 1944 the Danish resistance newspaper De frie Danske brought condemning reactions from influential Scandinavians, including Hemmer.

Inwardly troubled, he experienced several religious crises and alcoholism and finally committed suicide.

Works in English 
 The Voices  1914.
 Realm of the Rye. Helsinki: Akademiska Bokhandeln, 1938. 
 Fool of faith. New York: Liveright Pub. Corp., 1935,

References

Further reading  
 

1893 births
1944 suicides
People from Vaasa
People from Vaasa Province (Grand Duchy of Finland)
Finnish writers in Swedish
Finnish poets in Swedish
Writers from Ostrobothnia (region)
20th-century poets
Suicides in Finland